María Isabel Elizalde Arretxea (born 13 November 1964) is a Navarrese politician, Minister of Rural Development, Local Administration and Environment of Navarre from July 2015 to August 2019.

References

1964 births
Government ministers of Navarre
EH Bildu politicians
Living people
Politicians from Navarre